Marcus Michael Riccelli (born June 7, 1978) is an American politician of the Democratic Party. He is a member of the Washington House of Representatives, representing the 3rd district.

Riccelli is a graduate of Mead High School in Spokane. He received a Bachelor of Business Administration degree from Gonzaga University in 2000, and a Master of Public Administration degree in 2007 from the Daniel J. Evans School of Public Affairs at the University of Washington. He worked as U.S. Senator Maria Cantwell’s Eastern Washington director and as senior policy adviser to the former state Senate majority leader Lisa Brown.

He was elected to the Washington State House of Representatives in 2012.

Riccelli is married with two children.

References

External links 
 Marcus Riccelli at ballotpedia.org

Democratic Party members of the Washington House of Representatives
Living people
Politicians from Spokane, Washington
1978 births
21st-century American politicians
Evans School of Public Policy and Governance alumni
Gonzaga University alumni